Mashadi Azizbey oghlu Azizbeyov, also spelled Azizbeyov (January 6, 1876 - September 20, 1918) was a Soviet revolutionary of Azerbaijani origin, leader of the revolutionary movement in Azerbaijan, one of the first Azeri Marxists, Provincial Commissioner and Deputy People's Commissar of Internal Affairs, gubernial commissar for Baku. He was one of the 26 Baku Commissars.

Azizbeyov became a member of Russian Social Democratic Labour Party and one of the leaders of Muslim Social Democratic Party. After the October Revolution he joined the Baku Comissars. As the Baku Commune was voted out of power in July 1918, Azizbeyov and rest of the Commissars abandoned Baku and fled across the Caspian Sea. However they were captured by anti-Soviet forces. On the night of September 20, Azizbeyov was executed by a firing squad in a remote location between the stations of Pereval and Akhcha-Kuyma on the Trans-Caspian railway.

Currently the views on Azizbeyov are mixed. Azerbaijani nationalism, the ruling New Azerbaijan Party as well as the main opposition parties Musavat and APFP don't see Azizbeyov as a positive figure. Though Azerbaijan Communist Party and many other local left-wing politicians and sees Azizbeyov as an important, notable and positive figure in the history of Azerbaijan.

Biography

Early life

Soviet sources claimed that he was born into the family of bricklayers but according to the grandson of Mashadi; Mehdi Azizbeyov his grandfather was born into a family of noblemen and Mashadi's father was close friends with Zeynalabdin Taghiyev but he was executed during the rule of Tsarist Russian Empire.

Mashadi finished secondary school in Baku in 1896 and moved to St. Petersburg to enter civil engineering school. He joined the Russian Social Democratic Party in 1898, and took part in student movements. In 1899 he entered the St. Petersburg Technological Institute and graduated in as an electrical engineer. He was fluent in Russian and German languages.

Political and social activities

Russia and Iran
He took part in the protest of Saint Petersburg factory workers in 1902 which he was persecuted for and in the Russian Revolution of 1905 as well as famous "Mazut" constitution movement in Azerbaijan. He was an organizer of the Baku Oil Workers Union. During World War I, he helped many war refugees and wounded regardless of their nationality.

Azizbeyov was the member of İctimaiyyun-amiyyun (Mujaheed) party in Iran, also chosen for Baku State Duma at that time. During the Iranian revolution of 1908-10 he had been to Iran for support in terms of literature and weaponry. In 1909 he was chosen as the head of the organization called "Help for Iranian Revolution" in Baku. He was invited to Rasht and Anzali for revolutionary works. He personally knew Sattar Khan.

Azerbaijan

He played a very active role for the establishment National Drama Theater of Azerbaijan (Academy National Drama Theater was named after him for a short time) and also contributed to the construction of Shollar water in Baku, as a financial supporter and as an engineer. During his job in Elektrichiskaya Sila he tried to stop the Azerbaijani-Armanian ethnic clashes. In 1906, he created the war "drujina" in Baku called Bayraği-nüsrət (Flag of the Glory). Then he played role in the publishment of the Bolshevik papers called Devet-Qoch and Priziv. He became the co-head of the cultural-educative society of Nijat and opened a new place to help the poor population of Baku. In 1914 he participated and actively supported the protest of Baku industrial workers. Jalil Mammadguluzadeh gave the first publication of Molla Nasraddin to Azizbeyov for his contributions to education in Azerbaijan at that time.

Baku Commissars and Death

After the 1917 revolution, he was elected to the Baku Commune. In March, he began participation in Hummet organizations. In April, he became part of the bureau of the Muslim Social Party in Baku. He continued similar activities for the rest of the year. He was one of the 26 Baku Commissars of the Soviet Commune that was established in the city after the October Revolution. According to the grandson of Mashadi; during March Days Mashadi was responsible of Shamakhi district and he saved the large part of population from the mass killings of Dashnaks as he believed the poor village population can not be dangerous to the revolution.

Azizbeyov was friends with Mammad Amin Rasulzade in the early 1900s when he was also the member of Hummet organization. When the Commune was toppled by the Centro Caspian Dictatorship, a British-backed coalition of Dashnaks, SRs and Mensheviks, Azizbeyov and his comrades were captured by British troops and executed by firing squad between the stations of Pereval and Akhcha-Kuyma of the Transcaucasian Railroad.

Azizbeyov, along with other Baku Comissars were buried with a huge ceremony in the center of Baku. In January 2009, the Baku authorities began the demolition of the city's 26 Commissars Memorial commemorating the 26 Commissars. The monument itself had been fenced-off since July 2008. The remains of the commissars were reburied at Hovsan Cemetery on 26 January 2009, with participation of Muslim, Jewish and Christian clergy who conducted religious ceremonies.

The dismantling was opposed by some local left-wingers and by the Azerbaijan Communist Party (1993) in particular. During the reburial not any information have been given to the family of Mashadi Azizbeyov while his family were wanting Azizbeyov to be reburied in the graveyard of Suvelan right to the grave of his mother. Currently in the graveyard it's impossible to recognize the which grave belongs to Mashadi Azizbeyov.

Personal life
Mashadi was married with the daughter of millionaire of the era Zarbaliyev and he had four children; Aslan, Beyimkhanum, Safura and Aziz who later became Major-General Quartermaster Service. His granddaughter Pustekhanum wrote number of books about her grandfather. His wife Khanum Azizbeyova became the chairman of the first women club in 1919 organized by the oil magnate Shamsi Asadullayev. She was also active in the magazine Şərq qadını (Woman of East), which takes a notable part in the history of women in Azerbaijan. The grandson of his uncle's son Janibek Azizbeyov was killed during the First Nagorno-Karabakh War.

Legacy
In Soviet Union, Azizbeyov was portrayed as one of the fallen heroes of Russian Revolution. The first historical narrative in Azerbaijani literature, Komissar, by writer Mehdi Huseyn, features Azizbeyov as the main character. In cinema, he was portrayed in 26 Commissars (1933), Morning (1960, by Azeri actor Nodar Şaşıqoğlu), an adaptation of Komissar, and 26 Baku Commissars! (1966, by Azeri actor Məlik Dadaşov).  He, along with other Baku Commissars was subject to many films, documentaries, novels and poems of the Soviet Union, notably the 26-lar by Samed Vurgun, the novels Fighting City and Mysterious Baku by Mammad Said Ordubadi, also works of Nikolai Tikhonov, Nairi Zarian, Suleyman Rustam, Yeghishe Charents, Mikayil Mushfig, Vasily Kamensky, Paolo Iashvili, Semyon Kirsanov, Mirvarid Dilbazi, and Sergey Yesenin.

The towns of Vayk, Aregnadem and Zarritap, all in Armenia were officially named Azizbeyov during Soviet era. Busts of him in metro station in Georgia and one of the central parks of Armenia, monument and metro station in Azerbaijan were removed during the last decades. Khazar raion was officially called Azizbeyov until 2010. The street named after him in Turkmenistan was changed in recent years as well.

However still an avenue, street in Baku, villages in Goygol and Goranboy regions of Azerbaijan, a city in the Nakhichevan Autonomous Republic is officially called Azizbeyov. There are streets named after him in Kazakhstan (Almaty, Taraz), Russia (Volgograd, Astrakhan), Tajikistan (Dushanbe), Ukraine (Kryvyi Rih, Donetsk), and Uzbekistan (Jizzakh). There's an alleyway in Magaramkent (Dagestan) named after him.

References

External links
 Monument to Mashadi Azizbeyov in Baku
Encyclopaedia / People at www.bakupages.com
Bio

1876 births
1918 deaths
Articles containing video clips
Azerbaijani atheists
Azerbaijani Marxists
Azerbaijani revolutionaries
Executed Azerbaijani people
Executed politicians
Old Bolsheviks
Engineers from Baku
Russian Social Democratic Labour Party members
People of the Persian Constitutional Revolution
Politicians from Baku
Alumni by Baku Real School